Alison Mary Watkins  (born 29 December 1962) is an Australian CEO and director. She has had roles at McKinsey, GrainCorp, Berri Limited, and was a group managing director at Coca-Cola Amatil from March 2014 to May 2021. She has been a member of the Reserve Bank of Australia Board since December 2020, having previously served on their Takeover Panel. She has also held a number of non-executive directorships, including at the Centre for Independent Studies. In June 2021 she became Chancellor of the University of Tasmania.

Early life 
Watkins grew up on a farm in Tasmania, Australia. After boarding school she studied for a Bachelor of Commerce at the University of Tasmania. During this period she met her now husband Rod, with whom she has four children. After their university studies they moved to Sydney.

Career 
Watkins' first role was Junior Associate at McKinsey, where she remained for 10 years. In 1999 Watkins moved to ANZ as GGM Strategy & M&A, shifting after 18 months to lead their Regional banking division. She then took a leading role as CEO of Berri Ltd. Her first non-executive directorship was at Just Group. The first listed company she led was GrainCorp Ltd, where she was at the helm for 4 years. She is a former group managing director at Coca-Cola Amatil and is on the board of the Business Council of Australia.

She was appointed a Member of the Order of Australia in the 2022 Australia Day Honours for "significant service to business through leadership roles with a range of organisations".

References 

1962 births
Living people
Members of the Order of Australia
Australian businesspeople
University of Tasmania alumni
Academic staff of the University of Tasmania